The Wanderer is a 1967 French drama film based on the novel Le Grand Meaulnes by Alain-Fournier.

Cast 
 Brigitte Fossey - Yvonne de Galais
 Jean Blaise - Augustin Meaulnes
 Alain Libolt - François Seurel
 Alain Noury - Frantz de Galais
 Juliette Villard - Valentine Blondeau
 Christian de Tillière - Ganache
 Marcel Cuvelier - Monsieur Seurel
 Thérèse Quentin - Madame Seurel

External links 

1967 drama films
1967 films
French drama films
Films directed by Jean-Gabriel Albicocco
1960s French films